This page lists the major power stations located in Jiangsu Province.

Non-renewable

Coal-based

Natural gas-based

Nuclear

Renewable

Hydroelectric

Pumped-storage

Wind
Jiangsu is a major wind electricity power base that is developed in China. Its capacity is planned to reach 40-60GW. By 2010, the installed off-shore and close-shore wind electricity generation capacity is about 1.7GW, and will reach to 10GW (3GW in-land and 7GW off-shore and close-shore) by 2020.

Solar

References 

Buildings and structures in Jiangsu
Jiangsu